Qeshlaq-e Hammam Darreh (also Romanized as Qeshlāq-e Ḩammām Darreh; also known as Ḩammām Darreh) is a village in Sahneh Rural District, in the Central District of Sahneh County, Kermanshah Province, Iran. At the 2006 census, its population was 200, in 43 families.

References 

Populated places in Sahneh County